The Pacific Ocean Neutrino Experiment, or P-ONE, is a proposed neutrino observatory using an area of the north-eastern Pacific Ocean off the coast of British Columbia, Canada, to entrap neutrinos for study and experimentation. The proposal involves building a multi-cubic-kilometer neutrino telescope at Ocean Networks Canada’s Cascadia Basin site in the North East Pacific Time-series Underwater Networked Experiment (NEPTUNE) coastal network. Although a considerable number of neutrinos are produced in the universe, they are emitted at a considerably low flux, and therefore require a large detection array for their capture.

See also

 ANTARES (telescope)
 Baikal Deep Underwater Neutrino Telescope
 Hyper-Kamiokande
 IceCube Neutrino Observatory
 KM3NeT
 MINOS
 Super-Kamiokande
 Supernova Early Warning System

References

External links
 Official P-ONE WebSite
 P-ONE Presentation (video; 61:40) − (Elisa Resconi; 15 January 2021)
 P-ONE experiment record on INSPIRE-HEP
 

Neutrino observatories
Particle experiments